The Third Storm of Cythraul is the third full-length studio album by black metal band Absu. It was released on Osmose Productions in 1997.

Track listing
All songs written & arranged by Absu, except where noted.
"Prelusion to Cythraul featuring ...And Shineth Unto the Cold Cometh..." – 6:48
"Highland Tyrant Attack" – 4:48
"A Magician's Lapis-Lazuli" – 3:08
"Swords and Leather" – 3:08
"The Winter Zephyr (...Within Kingdoms of Mist)" – 2:59
"Morbid Scream" – 2:10 (Trent White)
"Customs of Tasseomancy (Quoth the Sky, Nevermore - Act I)" – 3:59
"Intelligence Towards the Crown" – 1:56
"...Of Celtic Fire, We Are Born/Terminus (...In the Eyes of Ioldánach)" – 8:32
Digipak Bonus Track
"Akhera Goiti - Akhera Beiti (One Black Opalith for Tomorrow)" – 7:26

Personnel
Shaftiel – electric lead & bass guitars, acoustic guitars, voice
Equitant Ifernain – electric lead & bass guitars
Proscriptor McGovern – drums, percussion, gong, bells & voice

Production
Arranged & produced by Absu
Executive producer: Osmose Productions
Recorded & engineered by Absu & Alex Gerst
Assistant engineer: Gary Long
Edited & mastered by Peter Clark

References

External links
Absu on Myspace

1997 albums
Absu (band) albums